The Reckoning is the first EP by American rock band Comes with the Fall.

Track listing
All lyrics and music by William Duvall, except where noted.

Personnel

Comes with the Fall
Bevan Davies — drums
William DuVall — vocals, guitar
Adam Stanger — bass guitar
Additional performers
 Noah Pine - piano on "Chameleon Blues"

Production
Produced by William DuVall
Engineered by Jeff Bakos
Mastered by Stephan Marsh

References

2006 debut EPs
Comes with the Fall albums